Gates-Livermore Cobblestone Farmhouse is a historic home located at Mendon in Monroe County, New York. It is a Federal style cobblestone farmhouse built about 1833. It is constructed of medium-sized field cobbles and is one of only 10 surviving cobblestone buildings in Mendon.  Also on the property are an extensive collection of agricultural support structures.

It was listed on the National Register of Historic Places in 1996.

References

Houses on the National Register of Historic Places in New York (state)
Cobblestone architecture
Federal architecture in New York (state)
Houses completed in 1833
Houses in Monroe County, New York
National Register of Historic Places in Monroe County, New York